Sisyropa is a genus of flies in the family Tachinidae.

Species
S. alypiae Sellers, 1943
S. eudryae (Townsend, 1892)
S. formosa Mesnil, 1944
S. heterusiae (Coquillett, 1899)
S. picta (Baranov, 1935)
S. prominens (Walker, 1859)
S. stylata (Townsend, 1933)
S. thermophila (Wiedemann, 1830)

References

Diptera of North America
Diptera of Asia
Exoristinae
Tachinidae genera
Taxa named by Friedrich Moritz Brauer
Taxa named by Julius von Bergenstamm